Ruggero Ignacio Cozzi Elzo (born 9 December 1986) is a Chilean lawyer that is member of the Chilean Constitutional Convention.

References

External links
 
 BCN Profile

Living people
1986 births
21st-century Chilean lawyers
21st-century Chilean politicians
Pontifical Catholic University of Chile alumni
National Renewal (Chile) politicians
Members of the Chilean Constitutional Convention
People from Santiago